Galin Qeshlaqi (also Romanized as Galīn Qeshlāqī; also known as Galīn Qeshlāq and Kelenshtally) is a village in Sanjabad-e Shomali Rural District, in the Central District of Kowsar County, Ardabil Province, Iran. At the 2006 census, its population was 133, in 24 families.

References 

Tageo

Towns and villages in Kowsar County